Mexel Industries S.A. is a company based in Verberie (Oise), France. Founded in 1990 to develop solutions to treating the water used for cooling in industrial processes, the company aims for environmentally friendly solutions, lower carbon emissions and to repel and disperse fouling agents using less than lethal means.

Biofilm removal system 

Industrial processes experience problems with fouling from a variety of biological and chemical sources that significantly increase their operating and maintenance costs and decrease their efficiency.

Mexel's mixture is injected in microdose (+ / -5 ppm) for a 30 minute duration once per day. It migrates to the surface and deposits a molecular film (10−8mm).

The mixture is a micro and macro anti-fouling material that acts as a corrosion inhibitor and scale dispersant as well as having some activity against freshwater and saltwater mussels and barnacles. It adsorbs to exposed surfaces and forms a biofilm on internal components when present is circulating water. Once the material is absorbed to a surface, biofouling organisms are inhibited from forming an attachment and it remains in place until it degrades, and this hopefully minimizes its presence in outfall.

By removing the biofilm from system surfaces, the mixture inhibits toxic algae (Naegleria fowleri) blooms and growth of bacteria colonies by species including SRB, TRB and legionella. Mexel mixtures are not sufficiently toxic to kill these organisms in the water column, but it should retard population growth by eliminating their habitat.

The emulsion is non-oxidant and tensioactive.

References 
1. Allonier, A.S., et Khalanski, M., 1996. Biodégradation du Mexel 432 par des bactéries de la Seine. Département Environnement, Groupe Gestion de l'Eau et Environnement, Electricité de France, Direction des Etudes et Recherches, Rapport n° HE-31/96-020, 17 pp.
2. Arehmouch, L., Ghillebaert, F., Chaillou, C., et Roubaud, P., 1999. Lethal effects of Mexel 432, an antifouling agent, on embryolarval development of common carp(Cyprinus carpio L.). Ecotoxicol. Environ. Safety, 42 : 110-118.
3. Czembor, N., Giamberini, L., and Pihan, J.C., 1997. Effects of Mexel 432 on pumping and valve activities of zebra mussel: used of a new experimental evaluation system. 7th International Zebra mussel conference, New-Orleans, 28- 31 Jan, 13 pp.
4. Breton, G., et Vincent, T., 2002. La plongée subaquatique permet-elle d’évaluer de manière fiable la biodiversité de l’épibenthos dans un port ? Bull. Soc. Zool. Fr., 127(2): 83-94.
5. Ghillebaert, F., 1998. Dosage colorimétrique du produit Mexel 432/0 dans les eaux du Port du Havre, rapport ecotox, 20 pp.
6. Haddouk, H., 2001. 27346 - Bacterial reverse mutation test. Centre International de Toxicologie. 36 pp.
7. Institut Pasteur de Lille, 2003. Recherche d’aberrations chromosomiques par
analyse de métaphases sur lymphocytes humains en culture sur le produit Mexel
432/0, IPL-R030108 / Mexel 432/0 / EDF Recherche et Développement. 59 pp.

External links 
 Mexel (English and French)

Water companies of France
Technology companies of France
1990 establishments in France